Messaoud Boudjeriou ( is a town and commune in Constantine Province, Algeria. Formerly called Aïn Kerma, it named after Messaoud Boudjeriou who was an Algerian revolutionary (1930-1961).

References

Communes of Constantine Province